Manuel Busto (1 October 1932 – 9 October 2017) was a French professional racing cyclist. He rode in six editions of the Tour de France.

References

External links
 

1932 births
2017 deaths
French male cyclists
Sportspeople from Aveyron
Cyclists from Occitania (administrative region)